Zottegem (Sotteghem and Sottegem in older English and French language sources) is a municipality located in Belgium and more particularly in Flanders, in the province of East Flanders. The municipality comprises the town of Zottegem proper and the villages of Elene, Erwetegem, Godveerdegem, Grotenberge, Leeuwergem, Oombergen, Sint-Goriks-Oudenhove, Sint-Maria-Oudenhove, Strijpen and Velzeke-Ruddershove. On 1 January 2018, Zottegem had a total population of 26,373. The total area is 56.66 km2 which gives a population density of 470 inhabitants per km2.

Zottegem is part of the hilly geographical area of the Flemish Ardennes (Vlaamse Ardennen); the hills and cobblestone streets (Paddestraat) are regular locations in the springtime cycle classics of Flanders. The city is known for its ties with Lamoral, Count of Egmont; Lamoral has a castle (Egmontkasteel), a museum (Egmontkamer) and two statues in the centre of Zottegem. He is buried in a crypt (Egmontcrypte) under the church. Leeuwergem castle in Elene is an 18th-century stately home; Breivelde castle in Grotenberge is surrounded by an English landscape garden. The archaeological museum in Velzeke exhibits findings from Gallo-Roman culture.

Places of interest

Famous inhabitants
Urbain Braems, football player and manager, lives in Zottegem
Bart De Clercq, cyclist
Patricia de Martelaere (b. in Zottegem), writer
, former rector of Ghent University
Jessy De Smet, singer
Lamoral, Count of Egmont, general and statesman, is buried in Zottegem
Tim Matthys, football player, lives in Zottegem
Laurent Merchiers, politician
Lyne Renée (b. in Zottegem), actress
Paul Van Cauwenberge, former rector of Ghent University
 (b. in Zottegem), actress (The curiosity of Chance)

References

External links

Official website  - Information available in Dutch and limited information available in English, French and German

 
Municipalities of East Flanders
Populated places in East Flanders